Manolo Poulot Ramos (born June 28, 1974 in Guantánamo) is a Cuban judoka. At the 2000 Summer Olympics he won the bronze medal in the Men's Extra Lightweight (– 60 kg) category, together with Aidyn Smagulov.

References

External links
 
 

1974 births
Living people
Judoka at the 1996 Summer Olympics
Judoka at the 2000 Summer Olympics
Judoka at the 1995 Pan American Games
Judoka at the 1999 Pan American Games
Olympic bronze medalists for Cuba
Olympic judoka of Cuba
Sportspeople from Guantánamo
Olympic medalists in judo
Cuban male judoka
Medalists at the 2000 Summer Olympics
Pan American Games gold medalists for Cuba
Pan American Games silver medalists for Cuba
Pan American Games medalists in judo
Medalists at the 1999 Pan American Games
20th-century Cuban people
21st-century Cuban people